Everette Ishmael "Billy" Hughes (September 14, 1908 – May 6, 1995) was a Western Swing musician and songwriter. Born in Sallisaw, Oklahoma, he left for California during the Okie exodus of the 1930s. Billy Hughes and His Buccaroos performed during the 1940s and early 1950s. He also owned an independent recording company, Fargo Records. As a writer he is best known for "Tennessee Saturday Night" which was recorded by Red Foley and became a No. 1 hit in 1949. He died in Horatio, Arkansas.

Discography
(Partial discography)
{| class="wikitable"
!Session
!Title
!Recording
|-
|2283
|"My Adobe Hacienda"
|King 609
|-
|2285
|"Writing On The Wall"
|King 609
|-
|(1947)
|"Cocaine Blues"
|King 636
|-
|
|"Take Your Hands Off It (Birthday Cake)"
|
|-
|(Dec. 1959)
|"Waitin' For Saturday Night"
|Big D 45-BD-112
|-
|(Dec. 1959)
|"Tonight"
|Big D 45-BD-112
|}

Compositions
(partial list of songs written by Hughes)
{| class="wikitable"
!Title
!Year
!Collaborator
|-
|"Atomic Sermon"
|1953
|
|-
|"Beside The Alamo"
|1953
|
|-
|"Brimstone Beauty"
|1951
|
|-
|"Cheerful Mary In The Rain"
|1992
|
|-
|"City Song"
|1992
|
|-
|"Cocaine Blues"
|1947
|credited to Arnall
|-
|"Cowboy Saturday Night"
|1983
|Don Albright
|-
|"Darker Days"
|1992
|
|-
|"Dear Judge"
|1952
|
|-
|"For A Little While"
|1983
|Milam Albright
|-
|"I Loved You Once But I Can't Trust You Now"
|1940s
|Johnny Tyler
|-
|"I'll Kiss The Stamp On Your Letter"
|1953
|
|-
|"I'm Not Looking For An Angel"
|1953
|
|-
|"I'm Telling You"
|1940s
|Texas Jim Lewis
|-
|"If I Ever Stop Hurtin'"
|
|
|-
|"In the Shadows of My Heart"
|1940s
|
|-
|"Java Junction"
|1951
|Jess Willard
|-
|"Just Pack Up And Go"
|
|
|-
|"Lonely Side Of Town"
|1981
|
|-
|"Mama, Who Was That Man?"
|
|
|-
|"No Need To Knock On My Door"
|1940s
|
|-
|"Other Doors"
|1983 
|Don Albright
|-
|"She's An Okie"
|
|
|-
|"Somebody Better Than Me"
|
|
|-
|"Take Your Hands Off It (Birthday Cake)"
|1940s
|
|-
|"Tennessee Saturday Night"
|c. 1947
|
|-
|"This Troubled Mind O' Mine"
|
|
|-
|"Tonight"
|c. 1959
|
|-
|"Waitin' For Saturday Night"
|c. 1959
|
|}

References

Bibliography
Komorowski, Adam. Swinging Hollywood Hillbilly Cowboys (Properbox 85, 2004) booklet.

1908 births
1995 deaths
People from Sallisaw, Oklahoma
Country musicians from Oklahoma
Western swing performers
Western swing fiddlers
King Records artists
Four Star Records artists
20th-century American violinists